Portales is a city in and the county seat of Roosevelt County, New Mexico, United States.  Its population was 12,280 at the 2010 census. Portales is located near the larger city of Clovis,  and Cannon Air Force Base, a major contributor to the economy of the region.

Eastern New Mexico University opened in Portales in 1934 as Eastern New Mexico Junior College, and has since grown to become the third-largest university in the state. The area is one of the largest producers of Valencia peanuts in the United States and is the nation's top producer of certified organic peanut butter. Portales is home to about 40 dairies and a major US dairy solids plant, together producing and exporting hundreds of millions of dollars of local milk products each year.

City
The city's downtown area is centered around a traditional-style town square, based upon Spanish urban design. The center of the town square includes the 1930s WPA-style Roosevelt County Courthouse, including original architectural details from the era, as well as the adjacent 1930s post office. The Courthouse Square is ringed with retail shops. The Yam Theater, a historic theater located in the downtown area, has recently been renovated. Eastern New Mexico University (ENMU) forms a sizable district with its campus and surrounding residential stock catering largely to students. Arts and cultural offerings emanate from ENMU, the third-largest state university in New Mexico. Portales ranks in the top 20% of US cities for racial diversity, percentage of college-educated adults, and percentage of people who walk or bike to work. The city rates in the top 10% of US cities for a short commute, rent affordability, and low taxes.

History

Clovis Man inhabited the Blackwater Draw area north of Portales until 11,000 years ago.

Seminomadic non-Pueblo Southern Athabaskan groups (Apache, Navajo) occupied much of the area as early as the 13th century. In the early 18th century, the Comanche displaced the Apache, who had previously lived in this region. The Comanche commanded the area until late in the 19th century.

The surrounding area of eastern New Mexico is part of what came to be known in the colonial period during Spanish rule as the "Llano Estacado", an arid and treeless plateau bounded on the north and west by the Caprock Escarpment stretching south from the Canadian River and east along the Pecos River.  Spanish soldier and explorer Francisco Vázquez de Coronado, the first European to traverse the area in 1541, named the region after seeing these cliffs. From the north, they resemble a stockade (estacada) surrounding the high tableland, thus the name, meaning "stockaded plain" or "palisaded plain."

The US territorial settlement of Portales occurred in the late 19th century as cattle herders discovered a water source emanating from a rocky ledge resembling a Spanish porch. The local watering hole took on the name "Portales", and a few settlers began ranching nearby. The Pecos Valley and Northeastern Railroad arrived in 1899. The City of Portales was formally established in 1909. The first mayor of Portales was Washington Ellsworth Lindsey, who later became a governor of New Mexico.

The town developed in an orderly fashion through the early 20th century.
In particular, given its access to the Ogallala Aquifer, improved surface irrigation techniques supported steady growth in agriculture.

Eastern New Mexico University was established in 1934 as a teacher's college. Originally a junior college, it became a four-year institution in the mid-20th century. The Great Depression brought several important Works Progress Administration  construction projects, including the ENMU Administration Building, the downtown Portales Post Office, and the Roosevelt County Courthouse. All three buildings are listed on the National Register of Historic Places.

Geography
Portales is located in Eastern New Mexico at  (34.182184, -103.338737).

Climate
Portales has a semiarid climate (Köppen climate classification BSk) with hot summers featuring most of the year's rainfall from thunderstorms during the latter half of the season, plus dry winters with typically freezing mornings and mild, sunny afternoons.

Demographics

As of the census of 2000,  11,131 people, 4,188 households, and 2,659 families were residing within the city limits of Portales. By 2007, the number of people counted in Portales, including those within the city limits and in the nearby surroundings had grown to nearly 17,000 people (University of New Mexico BBER). Eastern New Mexico University had over 4,300 students and 700 faculty and staff in 2008.

The population density of the city of Portales in 2000 was 1,624.9 people per square mile (627.4/km). The 4,862 housing units had an average density of 709.7 per square mile (274.0/km). The racial makeup of the city was 68.80% White, 2.28% African American, 1.12% Native American, 0.96% Asian, 0.09% Pacific Islander, 23.39% from other races, and 3.35% from two or more races. Hispanics or Latinos of any race were 38.13% of the population.

Of the 4,188 households in Portales in 2000, 33.6% had children under 18 living with them, 45.3% were married couples living together, 14.2% had a female householder with no husband present, and 36.5% were not families. About 27.8% of all households were made up of individuals, and 10.0% had someone living alone who was 65 or older. The average household size was 2.49, and the average family size was 3.09.

In the city, the age distribution was 26.3% under 18, 20.1% from 18 to 24, 25.4% from 25 to 44, 15.9% from 45 to 64, and 12.2% who were 65 or older. The median age was 27 years in 2000. For every 100 females, there were 93.6 males. For every 100 females 18 and over, there were 89.8 males.

The median income in 2000 for a household in the city was $24,658 and for a family was $30,462. Males had a median income of $27,080 versus $20,625 for females. The per capita income for the city was $12,935 in 2000. About 18.8% of families and 24.9% of the population were below the poverty line, including 25.5% of those under age 18 and 17.5% of those age 65 or over. By 2007, per capita income had risen significantly, while the poverty rate had dropped, in large part due to massive growth in the dairy industry. The creative class quotient for Portales was 21% in 2007.

Living
According to a study conducted by Bizjournals.com, of 577 micropolitan areas, Portales ranked 15th in the nation and 9th in the western United States in overall quality of life. The goal of the study was to identify America's most attractive micropolitan areas and points were given to small, well-rounded communities where the economy is strong, traffic is light, the cost of living is moderate, adults are well-educated, and access to big-city attractions is reasonably close.

The study identified 12 categories including population growth, per capita income, small business growth, professional jobs, commuting, cost of living, and advanced degrees. Cities were given points for positive results and negative scores if they were below the national averages. These scores were then totaled to determine its overall rank on the list of micropolitan areas.

Portales, the smallest city in the top 25, received a quality-of-life score of 8.96, the 15th highest score in the nation. According to Scott Thomas, the author of the study, the income per capita, short commuting times, low taxes, and substantial percentage of adults with a graduate degree contributed to the ranking. Los Alamos was the only other New Mexico city to be recognized in the top 20.

Economy
The economy of Portales and surrounding communities is strongly supported by the peanut and dairy industries, ENMU, value-added food processing, a growing military presence, and agriculture (including cattle ranching, dairy farming, and crop production). In recent years, the economy of Portales has grown significantly along with the price and volume of agricultural commodities being produced in the region. The area around Portales is also drawing increased attention for its abundance of steady wind power, solar energy, and biofuel feedstock.

Portales continues to be a major U.S. exporter of certified organic peanut products and a major U.S. processor and distributor of sweet Valencia peanuts. DairiConcepts with Dairy Farmers of America processes local milk into milk solids for domestic and export use.

The base operates a leased military-housing area in Portales with 150 single-family dwellings. Major Portales retailers include Walmart, Ace Hardware, Farmer's Country Market, Allsup's, and Stripes Convenience Stores. The town also contains small, privately owned boutique shops, restaurants, professional services, several furniture stores, and a number of discount retailers and auto dealers.

In 2002, the US Census recorded wholesale trade of $53,713,000 and retail trade of $147,174,000 in Roosevelt County. In 2006, data from econometrics firm EMSI predicted that by 2015, Roosevelt County would experience over 50% employment growth in several key economic sectors, including professional and business services, education and health services, and manufacturing. The same report predicted over 100% growth in leisure and hospitality services in the Portales area by 2015.

Unemployment in Roosevelt County in 2007 averaged less than 3%, and the cost of living was around 83% of the US average, based primarily on the historically low but rising cost of housing in the area. By 2009, Portales continued to experience economic growth, with unemployment in the 3.7% range. It remained partially insulated from the national economic downturn of 2008-2010 due in part to a balanced economy based on agribusiness and staple food-product manufacturing (primarily peanut butter and milk), higher education, and a relatively strong local retail services market fueled by a growing population of ENMU students and Cannon Air Force Base employees.

Notable people
 John Burroughs, Democratic governor of New Mexico, 1959–1961
 Ronny Cox, actor, singer, songwriter, and storyteller; starred in the film Deliverance and on the CBS series Apple's Way
 Ed Foreman, represented Texas and New Mexico in the United States House of Representatives, motivational speaker and philanthropist
 Darynda Jones, paranormal, mystery, and young-adult author
 Danny Leary, comedian and actor
 Wayne Mass, American football player
 Cody Ross, professional baseball player
 Christopher Stasheff, fantasy author
 Ned Sublette, singer and Cuban scholar
 Jack Williamson, science-fiction author

References

External links
 City of Portales
 Roosevelt County Chamber of Commerce
 Roosevelt County Community Development Corporation
 Eastern New Mexico University-Blackwater Draw Archaeological Site
 A resource for the Clovis/ Portales/ Curry/ Roosevelt and Cannon Air Force Base Community

 
Cities in Roosevelt County, New Mexico
Cities in New Mexico
County seats in New Mexico
Micropolitan areas of New Mexico
1909 establishments in New Mexico Territory